Jamasp was an Iranian philosopher in the time of Zoroaster.

Jamasp was the Grand Vizier of Gushtasp.

The book Jamasp Namag is about him.

Sources
دوستخواه، جلیل: اوستا، کهن‌ترین سرودهای ایرانیان، چاپ دوم، انتشارات مروارید، تهران ۱۳۷۴. 

Iranian philosophers
Shahnameh characters